The Queen Elizabeth Islands (formerly Parry Islands or Parry Archipelago) are the northernmost cluster of islands in Canada's Arctic Archipelago, split between Nunavut and the Northwest Territories in Northern Canada. The Queen Elizabeth Islands contain approximately 14% of the global glacier and ice cap area (excluding the inland and shelf ice sheets of Greenland and Antarctica).

Geography
The islands, together  in area, were renamed as a group after Elizabeth II on her coronation as Queen of Canada in 1953. The islands cover an area approximately the shape of a right triangle, bounded by the Nares Strait on the east, Parry Channel on the south and the Arctic Ocean to the north and west. Most are uninhabited although the Natural Resources Canada's Climate Change Geoscience Program Earth Sciences Sector (ESS), has monitors on the islands. In 1969 Panarctic Oils, now part of Suncor Energy, began operating exploration oil wells in the Franklinian and Sverdrup basins and planned on establishing its resource base in the Queen Elizabeth Islands. It ceased production in the 1970s. At the 2013 GeoConvention the Arctic Islands region were called Canada's perpetual "last petroleum exploration frontier". Hogg and Enachescu argued that the development and implementation of advanced marine and land seismic technologies in Alaska, Northern Europe and Siberia could be modified for use in the Queen Elizabeth Islands.

Queen Elizabeth Islands had not been fully charted until the British Northwest Passage expeditions and later Norwegian exploration of the 19th century.

These islands were known as the Parry Archipelago for over 130 years. They were first named after British Arctic explorer Sir William Parry, who sailed there in 1820, aboard the Hecla. Since the renaming of the archipelago in 1953, the term Parry Islands continued to be used for its southwestern part (less Ellesmere Island and the Sverdrup Islands). The regional break down of the archipelago is therefore as follows:
Ellesmere Island
Sverdrup Islands
Parry Islands

Ellesmere Island is the northernmost and by far the largest. The Sverdrup Islands are located west of Ellesmere Island and north of Norwegian Bay. The remaining islands further south and west, but north of the Parry Channel  (Lancaster Sound, Viscount Melville Sound and M'Clure Strait), have been carrying the name Parry Islands, which name until 1953 had also included the Sverdrup Islands and Ellesmere Island. South of the Parry Channel are the remaining islands of the Arctic Archipelago.

The islands lay on top of and were formed by the movement of the Queen Elizabeth Islands Subplate.

Major islands
Many of the islands are among the largest in the world, the largest being Ellesmere Island. Other major islands include Amund Ringnes Island, Axel Heiberg Island, Bathurst Island, Borden Island, Cornwall Island, Cornwallis Island, Devon Island, Eglinton Island, Ellef Ringnes Island, Mackenzie King Island, Melville Island, and Prince Patrick Island.

Smaller islands
Other smaller but notable islands include; Beechey Island, which held the graves of Petty Officer John Torrington, Royal Marine Private William Braine, and Able Seaman John Hartnell, three members of Sir John Franklin's crew who took part in his lost expedition, Hans Island, a small, uninhabited barren knoll measuring  whose ownership is disputed by Canada and Denmark, the Cheyne Islands, three small ( together) islands that are Important Bird Area (#NU049) and a Key Migratory Bird Terrestrial Habitat site (NU site 5) and Skraeling Island an important archaeological site where Inuit (along with their ancestors the Dorset and Thule) and Norse artifacts have been found. They consist of Silurian and Carboniferous rocks covered with tundra.

Population
With a population of less than 400, the islands are nearly uninhabited. There are only three permanently inhabited places in the islands. The two municipalities are the hamlets of Resolute (population 198 as of the 2016 census), on Cornwallis Island, and Grise Fiord (population 129 as of the 2016 census), on Ellesmere Island. Alert is a weather station staffed by Environment and Climate Change Canada, a Global Atmosphere Watch (GAW) atmosphere monitoring laboratory on Ellesmere Island, and has several temporary inhabitants due to the co-located CFS Alert. Eureka, a small research base on Ellesmere Island, has a population of zero but at least eight staff on a continuous rotational basis.

Formerly staffed stations were Mould Bay on Prince Patrick Island, Isachsen on Ellef Ringnes Island, and Fort Conger on Ellesmere Island.

Abandoned settlements are Dundas Harbour on Devon Island and Craig Harbour on Ellesmere Island.

Administration 
Until 1999, the Queen Elizabeth Islands were part of the Baffin Region of the Northwest Territories.

With the creation of Nunavut in 1999 all islands and fractions of islands of the archipelago east of the 110th meridian west became part of the Qikiqtaaluk Region of the new territory, which was the major portion of the archipelago. The rest remained with the now-reduced Northwest Territories. Borden Island, Mackenzie King Island and Melville Island were divided between the two territories.

Prince Patrick Island, Eglinton Island and Emerald Island are the only notable islands that are now completely part of the Northwest Territories.

Below the level of the territory, there is the municipal level of administration. On that level, there are only two municipalities, Resolute and Grise Fiord, with an aggregate area of  (0.11 percent of the area of the Queen Elizabeth Islands), but with most of the population of the archipelago (370 out of 375). The remaining 99.89 percent are unincorporated area, with a census 2006 population of five, all in Alert.

Overview of the islands 
According to the Atlas of Canada there are 34 larger and 2,092 smaller islands in the archipelago. With the exception of Ellesmere Island, they fall into two groups, the Sverdrup Islands and the Parry Islands:

Glaciers and ice caps 

In 2000 it was estimated that the Queen Elizabeth Islands were covered by about  glaciers that represent c.14% of all glaciers and ice caps in the world. The size of these glaciers has been measured since 1961 and their results published in such distinguished journals as the International Glaciological Society's Annals of Glaciology.

Of the four ice caps that the federal government's NRCan's Climate Change Geoscience Program Earth Sciences Sector (ESS), monitors onsite in the Canadian High Arctic, three are in the Queen Elizabeth Islands: Devon, Meighen and Melville. A 2013 Natural Resources Canada memo says that shrinking of the ice caps started in the late 1980s, and has accelerated rapidly since 2005. The increased melt rate was confirmed by University of California, Irvine in 2017.

Computer analysis of a glacier inventory of Axel Heiberg Island was undertaken in the 1960s. Later inventories of the World Glacier Monitoring Service under the direction of Fritz Müller, who worked on glacier inventories internationally, included the Axel Heiberg Island glacier.

Other glaciers and ice caps in the Queen Elizabeth Islands include the Agassiz Ice Cap, Benedict Glacier, Disraeli Glacier, Eugenie Glacier, Gull Glacier, Parrish Glacier, Sven Hedin Glacier and the Turnabout Glacier.

See also 

 List of islands of Canada
 List of Canadian islands by area

References

External links

  at oceandots.com
  at oceandots.com
  at oceandots.com

 
Archipelagoes of the Canadian Arctic Archipelago